Dhamra Airstrip  is a proposed to be built by the Dhamra Port Company Limited, 20 km from Dhamra Port in the Bhadrak district of Odisha, India.

In 2018, the Dhamara Port Company Limited (DPCL), run by the Adani Group, forwarded a proposal to the Odisha government to set up an airport  to boost commercial activities near the Dhamra port. The Odisha government accorded in-principle approval in September 2018 and sought a detail project report.
In November 2018, the State Government signed a Memorandum of Understanding with DPCL for the development of a commercial airport over 500 acres at the cost of Rs. 500 crore.

In January 2020, the Government approved of DPCL's proposal to acquire 274 acres of land for the airstrip. The State Government would take a call on acquiring the remaining land for the project at a later date.

References

Airports in Odisha
Proposed airports in Odisha
Bhadrak district